Jinfeng Township is a township under the administration of Chun'an County, Zhejiang, China. , it has 11 villages under its administration.

References 

Townships of Zhejiang
Chun'an County